Tunquén is a beach and locality in the coast of Valparaíso Region, Chile. The beach is known for its relatively intact nature lacking houses or other infrastructure. The area contain archaeological sites corresponding to pre-Hispanic tombs and shell middens. The archaeology of Tunquén has been investigated as holding possible evidence of pre-Hispanic Polynesian presence in Chile.

References

Beaches of Chile
Landforms of Valparaíso Region
Tourist attractions in Valparaíso Region
Coasts of Valparaíso Region